The 2012–13 Northeastern Huskies men's basketball team represented Northeastern University during the 2012–13 NCAA Division I men's basketball season. The Huskies, led by seventh year head coach Bill Coen, played their home games at Matthews Arena and were members of the Colonial Athletic Association. They finished the season 20–13, 14–4 in CAA play to claim the regular season CAA championship. They advanced to the championship game of the CAA tournament where they lost to James Madison. As a regular season conference champion who failed to win their conference tournament, they earned an automatic bid to the 2013 NIT where they lost in the first round to Alabama.

Roster

Schedule

|-
!colspan=9| Regular season

|-
!colspan=9| 2013 CAA tournament

|-
!colspan=9| 2013 NIT

References

Northeastern Huskies men's basketball seasons
Northeastern
Northeastern